The 1986 Zetters Welsh Professional Championship was a professional non-ranking snooker tournament, which took place in February 1986.

Terry Griffiths won the tournament defeating Doug Mountjoy 9–3 in the final.

Main draw

References

Welsh Professional Championship
Welsh Professional Championship
Welsh Professional Championship
Welsh Professional Championship